The Meurthe is a river in north-eastern France, right tributary to the river Moselle. Its source is in the Vosges mountains, near the Col de la Schlucht in the Vosges département, from where it flows in an overall north-westerly direction. Its name gave rise to the naming of the present French département Meurthe-et-Moselle and the former (before the change in the Franco-German border after the Franco-Prussian war of 1870) département Meurthe.

Channelled during its route through Nancy, the river flows into the Moselle at Pompey on the northern edge of Nancy, a short distance down-stream from the Port of Frouard.

Towns along the river Meurthe include:
 in Vosges: Fraize, Saint-Dié-des-Vosges, Raon-l'Étape
 in Meurthe-et-Moselle: Baccarat, Lunéville and Nancy

Tributaries include:
 Fave
 Rabodeau
 Plaine
 Vezouze
 Mortagne
 Sânon

References

Rivers of France
Rivers of Meurthe-et-Moselle
Rivers of Vosges (department)
Rivers of Grand Est